Cossacks of the Kuban from Mosfilm is a color film, glorifying the life of the farmers in the kolkhoz of the Soviet Union's Kuban region, directed by Ivan Pyryev and starring Marina Ladynina, his wife at that time. The movie premiered on 26 February 1950.

Synopsis
The film is set during the early post-war years. In autumn at the inter-collective farm fair, a dashing horse breeder Nikolai (Vladlen Davydov) gets acquainted with an advanced collective farmer Dasha Shelest (Klara Luchko). Their infatuation is mutual, but the lovers, working in different farms will have to overcome the resistance of their leaders, who do not want to lose great employees. Chairman of the "Red Partisans", where Dasha works, Gordei Voron (Sergey Lukyanov) has long been fond of the chairman Galina Peresvetova (Marina Ladynina) of the "Precepts of Ilyich" collective farm where Nikolai works. But he can not muster up the courage to confess his love to her and Galina ends up having to confess first.

Cast (partial list) 
 Marina Ladynina as Galina
 Sergei Lukyanov as Gordei Gordeyich Voron
 Vladimir Volodin as Anton Petrovich Mudretsov
 Yuri Lyubimov as Andrey
 Aleksandr Khvylya as Denis Stepanovich
 Klara Luchko as Darya Shelest
 Ekaterina Savinova as Lubochka
 Viktor Avdyushko as stableman
 Valentina Telegina as Khristoforovna
 Vladlen Davydov as Nikolai Matveyevich Kovalev

Songs (partial list) 
 How Have You Been, Dearest?
 Oh, the Kalina Flowers Are in Bloom (ditto)

See also
 Cinema of the Soviet Union
 Cinema of Russia
 Kolkhoz
 Kuban
 Kuban Cossacks
 Ballad of Siberia

References

External links

 Watch Cossacks of the Kuban online at official Mosfilm site (with English subtitles)

1950 films
Mosfilm films
Cossacks
Agriculture in the Soviet Union
Films directed by Ivan Pyryev
Films scored by Isaak Dunayevsky
Films set in Russia
Films set in the Soviet Union
Films shot in Krasnodar Krai
Soviet musical comedy films
1950 musical comedy films
Soviet propaganda films